The Hunt for the Four Brothers is the 155th title of the Hardy Boys series, written by Franklin W. Dixon.  The book was first published by Pocket Books in 1999.

Plot summary
The Hardy Boys try to help a friend of theirs find four precious gems.  If they don't find them in time, it will be too late.

References

Sources

The Hardy Boys books
1999 American novels
1999 children's books
Pocket Books books